East Sable River, Nova Scotia  is a community in the Shelburne County, Nova Scotia, Canada. It is on the east bank of the Sable River estuary.

References

General Service Areas in Nova Scotia
Communities in Shelburne County, Nova Scotia